Tone Rasmussen (born April 1, 1968) is a Norwegian sprint canoer who competed in the early 1990s. She was eliminated in the semifinals of the K-4 500 m event at the 1992 Summer Olympics in Barcelona.

References
Sports-Reference.com profile

1968 births
Canoeists at the 1992 Summer Olympics
Living people
Norwegian female canoeists
Olympic canoeists of Norway
Place of birth missing (living people)